Seymour station is a commuter rail stop on the Waterbury Branch of the Metro-North Railroad's New Haven Line, located in Seymour, Connecticut.

Station layout
The station has one low-level side platform to the west of the tracks, long enough for one door of one car to receive and discharge passengers. The eastern track is a freight siding, not adjacent to the platform. The station is owned and operated by the Connecticut Department of Transportation, but Metro-North is responsible for maintaining platform lighting as well as trash and snow removal. A small parking lot is managed by the town of Seymour.

History
The Naugatuck Railroad opened from Milford north to Seymour in May 1849, with the extension to Waterbury opening the next month. The original wooden station was replaced in 1898 by a buff brick station, now demolished. A small modern brick shelter was installed in the 1980s or 1990s.

References

External links

Connecticut Department of Transportation "Condition Inspection for the Seymour Station" July 2002
 Station House from Google Maps Street View

Stations along New York, New Haven and Hartford Railroad lines
Metro-North Railroad stations in Connecticut
Railroad stations in New Haven County, Connecticut
Seymour, Connecticut
Transportation in New Haven County, Connecticut